Henry Parker, 10th Baron Morley (1476/1480/14813 December 1553/1556), (notes to Parliamentary records show this as 25 November 1556) was an English peer and translator, Lord of Morley, Hingham, Hockering, &c., in Norfolk. He was the son of Alice Parker, 9th Baroness Morley, née Lovel (c. 1467–1518) and her husband Sir William Parker, who was Privy councillor and standard bearer to King Richard III.

He married Alice St John, granddaughter of Sir John St John (1426–1498) and his wife Alice Bradshaigh, and thus a descendant of Sir Oliver St John and his wife Margaret Beauchamp of Bletsoe, by whom he had one son, Sir Henry Parker, who was knighted at the coronation of Anne Boleyn and died in his father's lifetime. The son of Sir Henry Parker, Henry, succeeded his grandfather as Baron Morley.  Henry Parker, 10th Baron Morley, had three daughters: Margaret, who married John Shelton, Jane, who married George Boleyn, Viscount Rochford, the brother of Henry VIII's second wife, Anne Boleyn, and Alice, who married Sir Thomas Barrington.

In 1523, he was sent as an ambassador to Germany to present the Order of the Garter to Archduke Ferdinand (later Ferdinand I, Holy Roman Emperor). He was a man of literary attainments and translated some of the writings of Plutarch, Seneca, Cicero and others into English.

References

15th-century births
1550s deaths
15th-century English people
English translators
15th-century English writers
16th-century English writers
16th-century male writers
People from South Norfolk (district)
16th-century translators
Henry
16th-century English diplomats
English male non-fiction writers
16th-century English nobility
Barons Morley